Chhoto Bou (English: Younger Wife) is a 1988 Bengali film directed by Anjan Choudhury and produced by Prabir Rakshit under the banner of Shree Krishna Film Production, Kolkata. The film features actors Prosenjit Chatterjee, Ranjit Mallick, Sandhya Roy and Debika Mukhopadhyay in the lead roles. Music of the film has been composed by Sapan Chakraborty. The film was remade in Telugu as Chinna Kodallu (1990), in Tamil as Chinna Marumagal (1992), in Odia as Panjuri Bhitare Sari (1992), in BangladeshI (Bengali)  as Choto Bou (1990) and in Hindi as Chhoti Bahoo (1994).

Cast 
 Ranjit Mallick as Anu (Tanu's Brother)
 Sandhya Roy as Mamta / Borobou (Tanu's Sister in law)
 Prosenjit Chatterjee as Tanu
 Debika Mukherjee as Deepa / Chhotobou (Tanu's wife, main protagonist)
Ratna Ghoshal as Latika (Tanu's Sister)
 Kali Bandyopadhyay as Tanu's Father
 Soham Chakraborty as Raju
 Nimu Bhowmik as Nitai Mama
Sanghamitra Mukhopadhyay as Tandra / Mejobou
Sumanta Mukherjee as Chinu
Meenakshi Bhowmick as Tanu's mother

Soundtrack

References

External links
 

Bengali-language Indian films
1988 films
1980s Bengali-language films
Indian drama films
Bengali films remade in other languages
Films directed by Anjan Choudhury
1988 drama films